Claire Linton Cribbs (August 13, 1912 – September 14, 1985) was an American basketball player and high school coach.  He was a two-time All-American at the University of Pittsburgh and won over 400 games as a high school coach in the state of Ohio.

Cribbs, a 6'0 (1.83 m) guard from Jeannette High School in Jeannette, Pennsylvania, chose to attend the nearby University of Pittsburgh and play for Hall of Fame coach Doc Carlson.  Cribbs led the Panthers to a 53–15 record in his three varsity seasons, winning the Eastern Intercollegiate Conference in 1933 and 1934 and tying for the championship with West Virginia in 1935.  Cribbs was the star of these teams, garnering all-conference honors all three years and consensus All-American honors as a junior and senior.

After graduating from Pitt, Cribbs briefly played baseball as a pitcher for the International League's Baltimore Orioles.  He then became a teacher and coach at Warren Consolidated High School in Tiltonsville, Ohio, where he coached future baseball Hall of Famer Bill Mazeroski.  After a tour in the U. S. Navy during World War II, he became a history teacher and boys' basketball coach at Bellaire High School in Bellaire, Ohio in 1949.  He remained coach there until his retirement in 1977, winning over 400 games and at one point leading the Big Reds to victory for 54 consecutive home games.

Claire Cribbs is enshrined in the University of Pittsburgh Hall of Fame, as well as the Ohio basketball coaches, Dapper Dan, and Westmoreland County (PA) halls of fame.  He died on September 14, 1985 in Bellaire.

References

1912 births
1985 deaths
All-American college men's basketball players
United States Navy personnel of World War II
Baltimore Orioles (IL) players
Basketball players from Pennsylvania
Guards (basketball)
High school basketball coaches in Ohio
Pittsburgh Panthers men's basketball players
People from Westmoreland County, Pennsylvania
American men's basketball players